Kim Gae-si (Hangul: 김개시, Hanja: 金介屎; died 1623) or formally called Court Lady Kim (Hangul: 상궁 김씨, Hanja: 尙宮 金氏) was a Court Lady during the Joseon Dynasty of Korea, who became a concubine of King Seonjo and later of his son, Gwanghae, after Seonjo death. During the latter's reign, she intervened in state affairs and wielded power, but was beheaded after Gwanghae's deposition from the throne.

Biography
There are special records about her family or her early life. It is just recorded that she was a palace maid (춘궁) in Crown Prince Gwanghae's palace. Then, she received Seung-eun (승은, 承恩) from Gwanghae's father, King Seonjo, and became his favourite concubine. Even though she was not beautiful, she was favoured and liked by both of Seonjo and Gwanghae due to her agility and skill. After Seonjo's death on March 16, 1608, she became Gwanghae's concubine. At the time, it was acceptable for the next King take their father's former consort, with the exception of the primary wife and their own biological mother. After Gwanghae took the throne, she helped him in succeeding to confine his legal mother, Queen Inmok, by killing her only son and the only legitimate son of Seonjo, Grand Prince Yeongchang (영창대군).

Despite her lowly background and status as a palace maid, Lady Kim wielded power to the extent that she was worked with Yi Yi-cheom (이이첨) and Gwon Sin (권신). Her power surpassed Queen Yu (중전 유씨), whom was Gwanghae's primary wife.

Later, on March 13, 1623, after King Injo was crowned following a rebellion led by Seoin faction (서인, 西人), Lady Kim, along with all of Gwanghae's people and supporters, were executed.

Confrontation
In the Gyechuk Diary, it was said that the Court Lady and Queen Inmok had a bad relationship, because Lady Kim tried to blame her miscarriage on the Queen's daughter, Princess Jeongmyeong.

In popular culture

Drama & Television series
Portrayed by Kim Bo-yeon in the 1982 MBC TV series Woman Exhibition in the West Palace? (여인열전 - 서궁마마).
Portrayed by Won Mi-kyung in the 1986 MBC TV series The Hoechun Gate.
Portrayed by Lee Young-ae in the 1995 KBS2 TV series West Palace.
Portrayed by Lee Joo-hwa in the 2000 – 2001 KBS2 TV series Roll of Thunder.
Portrayed by Park Sun-young in the 2003 – 2004 SBS TV series The King's Woman.
Portrayed by Jeon Min-seo and Jo Yoon-hee in the 2014 – 2015 KBS2 TV series The King's Face.
Portrayed by Shin Rin-ah, Jo Jung-eun and Kim Yeo-jin in the 2015 MBC TV series Splendid Politics.
Portrayed by Min Ji-ah in the 2019 tvN TV series The Crowned Clown.
Portrayed by Song Seon-mi in the 2021 MBN TV series Bossam: Steal the Fate.

Film
Portrayed by Lee Min-ja in the 1962 South Korean film Queen Dowager Inmok.

Webtoon
 Portrayed in the 2019 KakaoPage Webtoon series Finally, the Blue Flame (마침내 푸른 불꽃이).

See also
Jang Nok-su
Jang Ok-jeong
Jeong Nan-jeong

References

Royal consorts of the Joseon dynasty
1623 deaths
Executed Korean women
Deaths by decapitation
Year of birth unknown
Date of birth unknown
16th-century Korean women
17th-century Korean women
Korean ladies-in-waiting
1584 births